Haraszti is a Hungarian surname. Notable people with the surname include:

Emil Haraszti (1885–1958), Hungarian-born French music critic and writer
Gábor Haraszti, Hungarian sprint canoeist
János Haraszti (1924- 2007), Hungarian veterinarian, academic
Mici Haraszti (1882–1964), Hungarian actress
Miklós Haraszti (born 1945), Hungarian writer, journalist and academic
Zsolt Haraszti (born 1991), Hungarian footballer

Hungarian-language surnames